The Broons (English: The Browns) is a comic strip in Scots published in the weekly Scottish newspaper The Sunday Post. It features the Brown family, who live in a tenement flat at 10 Glebe Street in (since the late 1990s) the fictional Scottish town of Auchentogle or Auchenshoogle.

Created by writer/editor R. D. Low and artist Dudley D. Watkins, the strip made its first appearance in the issue dated 8 March 1936.

Since its inception, The Broons have had their own biennial, alternating each year with Oor Wullie. No annuals were published during 1943 and 1944 due to paper rationing in World War II but jigsaws were created instead.  Starting with the 2015 editions, the titles are now published together annually.

Characters

The family members include:
Paw Broon – the patriarch, a working man who occasionally tries to keep enough back for a bit of "baccy" (tobacco) and a bet on the horses. In a flashback to his youth, Paw was seen with his immediate family before he and Maw were married. His mother, Granmaw, was seen as well as his sister Daphne and brother Joseph. As Granpaw is a widower, and Aunt Daphne and Uncle Joseph are never seen, Paw has named two of his children after his siblings – his oldest daughter, Daphne, and his second son, Joe. With his comb-over hairstyle and walrus moustache, his appearance was supposedly based on A.C. "Archie" Brown, the chief editor of publisher D. C. Thomson & Co. Ltd at the time The Broons originated. Paw disapproves of most young behaviour. Paw is a main character: there are very few strips where he is not featured. It is usually him who ends up being made the idiot of, after he has made a smart-alec comment. Paw is generally said to be still working at the shipyards. However, in a few strips, he is depicted as being retired.
Maw Broon – the formidable mother of eight. She has to run every aspect of the household and keep her husband, Paw, in line. Her first name was once used when her brother came to visit. He burst into No. 10 addressing her as "Maggie" and looking for money for his taxi fare. The name Maggie was confirmed in Maw Broon's Cookbook, published in 2007. Another book was The But an' Ben Cookbook, Waverley Books, 2008  (the book from the family's holiday home, "the wee hoose among the heather"). In a 1980s strip the opening rhyme featured her name as Maigret (Margaret) Broon as well but this never continued. Maw comes from a more upper-class background, as seen in "Maw Broon's Remedies & Suchlike" where her mother has given her the book as a present and writes about how Maw should stop seeing Paw. In earlier strips she can be seen to make the family act rather posh which her daughters also take after her by doing so.
Granpaw Broon – Paw's widowed, 80-year-old father, lives in his own house and spends most of his time sitting on a park bench with his "cronies" (friends), or tending his allotment. He shares Paw's preoccupation with having an ample supply of tobacco. Granpaw was a slightly later addition, not appearing in the earliest strips. In some of these, the family had a picture of Granpaw on their wall, which could do certain actions, such as wagging its finger at the children. Initially, Granpaw was portrayed in a bad light, as a miser and a scheming moocher but was later written as a loveable rogue often who gets into more mischief than his young grandchildren. It was revealed in Maw Broon's Cookbook (2007) that his late wife was named Jeannie, a Scottish variation of "Jean" or "Jenny" that was once very popular. Granmaw was only seen twice, once in 1937, during a flashback of Maw and Paw's courting days, and again in 1959, when comparing life to the old days.
Hen (Henry) Broon – The lanky, awkward eldest son and firstborn child of Maw and Paw. About 31 years old, average and a guy who rarely gets the girl. He is often taken advantage of for his height; for example, being made to act as a clothes stand to keep the washing line up. Early Broons cartoons featured Hen wearing a zoot suit. Hen is aspirational, for example every couple of years or so he buys a car. Such purchases, however, always end in failure.
Daphne Broon – The plump, somewhat dowdy daughter who is always playing second fiddle to her beautiful sister Maggie on double dates. Every few years she has a stroke of luck when the double dates get mixed up and she gets Maggie's man. At least once a year Daphne tries to go on a diet but fails to lose any weight. She is often mocked by Hen and Joe about her diets, although their taunts are intentionally harmless. Daphne is a skilled dressmaker but has a penchant for flamboyant hats.
Joe (Joseph) Broon – the epitome of the ordinary working man, usually noted for his good looks, strength and love of sports and boxing. Joe is something of a ladies' man, and can sometimes be seen sharing a bitter rivalry with Hen over a beautiful woman, with Joe winning. Hen envies Joe's luck with the girls, and the twins see him as a role model.
Maggie (Margaret) Broon – The beautiful, glamorous daughter with blonde hair and fashionable clothing. She has a steady stream of beaux and is bitterly envied by the drab Daphne. In the later editions, Maggie became a model, and a weather girl. Despite their rivalry over men, Daphne and Maggie share a close bond and Maggie even stands up for Daphne when she is taunted; notably in one strip, flirting with a man in a bar and throwing the drink he had bought her over him as revenge for his hurtful comments toward Daphne.
Horace Broon – A bookish and bespectacled teenage schoolboy forever trying to learn French or poetry by rote amidst the chaos of a do-it-yourself chimney-sweeping mishap or other domestic turmoil. He is quite pompous and likes to think of himself as an example to the twins, but recently seems to aspire to be like Joe (for example, purchasing muscle-building equipment). However, he is nowhere near as popular with girls as Joe. Horace is seen as a young teenager in the early years of secondary school. However, during the 1990s, his appearance was that of someone slightly older. 
The Twins – Identical twin boys, who are in primary school. Although one is called Eck (short for Alexander), they are always referred to collectively, with few exceptions (such as Granpaw calling them "ae twin" and "the ither twin"). They are rambunctious youngsters and usually add to the chaos with a fistfight or a good game of cowboys and Indians.
The Bairn – The youngest of the family at about four years of age. She is basically a smaller version of Maw, getting in her share of indignant moral pronouncements and pointing out the foolishness of the male Broons. She and Granpaw are deeply close. Her first name is never revealed; she is simply addressed as "my wee lamb", "dear", "pet" etc.

Storylines
The family surname Broon is the Scots for Standard English "Brown," as indicated by the nameplate that occasionally appears on the front door of their flat. Also, when a family member is addressed by a non-Scot (i.e. an Englishman or an American), he or she is addressed as "Mister (or Mrs or Miss) Brown".

Early strips written in the 1930s featured less dialogue and the pictures told the story. This was more common in Oor Wullie strips. However, occasional Broons strips did this too.

During the 1970s, stories drawn by Tom Lavery, another character named Dave MacKay was regularly featured. Dave was Maggie's long-term boyfriend and later her fiancé, although the latter aspect only featured in the original Sunday Post strips, with all mentions of the engagement removed for the annual reprints. Although his father was an old school friend of Paw, his mother was upper–middle-class, much to the chagrin of Paw and Maw. Despite the Broons' perpetual deference to their social 'betters', many comical premises were built on the family's attempts to impress members of the landed gentry, or the clergy. Many storylines featured Paw bringing shame on the family by being seen wearing torn trousers or working clothes by the 'Meenister' (Church of Scotland minister). Maggie's character also changed during this time, becoming more posh. Unlike the rest of the Broons, she spoke Standard English rather than Modern Scots. When Peter Davidson took over from Lavery, the character was dropped without explanation. The 2012 special annual The Broons and Oor Wullie: Classic Strips from the 70's reveals the fate of the character which was created specially for this book.

Most of the humour derives from the timeless themes of the "generation gap," stretching the money as far as possible, and the constant struggle for each family member to live in a very small flat with the other nine Broons. In the end, the family always support one another, getting through life with a gentle good humour as they argue amongst themselves.

Another staple of the series is misunderstanding: inevitably the bairn or the twins mishear something Granpaw or another family member says, and the whole family acts on it until the truth is revealed in the final panel. An example is where the twins are told by Daphne that she is bringing her boyfriend up to dinner and that he is half Polish and half French. While Maggie makes a French salad and Paw finds a flag from each country, Hen asks if they know the man's name – Angus MacKay. Hen and Paw go with the twins to see his shop. It turns out he is a French-polisher – "polish" being pronounced the same as "Polish" in Scots.

Locations
As with Oor Wullie, Watkins left the location of the strips unnamed, although the Broons' tenement is located on Glebe Street, a commonly used name in many Scottish towns. However, as originally written, Watkins' use of words and phrases more commonly associated with the east coast of Scotland, such as bairn for child, as opposed to the west-central wean, suggests he was using his own immediate environment. (He lived in Broughty Ferry) He worked in Dundee and the Broons' dialect is mainly Dundonian.  Since the 1990s, however, The Broons has been set in the fictional town of Auchenshoogle (no connecxtion to the area of Glasgow, Auchenshuggle).

The Broons own a small cottage, called the but and ben, somewhere in the Highlands but within a relatively short distance of their home. They enjoy weekends away there, although the younger Broons show some reluctance to go there. In a 1940s strip, the house is shown to be on a hillside on the east side of the River Ness and an arrow also points to Auchentoogle being located on the northern bank of Loch Ness near Dores. The house was referred to as being in a secret location in "The Broons Days Oot" travel guide published in 2009. In Still Game's 2007 Hogmanay special, "Hootenanny," Jack compares Joe's Highland cottage to "the but 'n ben out of the bloody Broons", as a comical way to comment upon how shabby it appears.

Annuals
Although the Broons & Oor Wullie started in 1936, annuals were not published until 1939 starting with "The Broons". since then the annuals alternate years with Oor Wullie, another D. C. Thomson product. Books pre-1965 were not dated. After that they had a copyright date with annuals normally published in Autumn. The early editions of The Broons annual are highly sought-after collectors' items, fetching in excess of four-figure sums at auction. A facsimile of the very first Broons annual was released on 25 November 2006.

Watkins drew the strip from his Broughty Ferry home until his death in 1969. For five years after Watkins' death, D. C. Thomson recycled old strips in the newspaper and annuals, fearing no adequate replacement could be found to match Watkins' unique style. In these repeated strips, some particularly Scots words were replaced (e.g., 'ahint' became 'behind') and the pre-decimal coinage was updated. Mike Donaldson is the current artist, succeeding Peter Davidson. BBC Radio Scotland presenter Tom Morton was the scriptwriter until 2006 when Dave Donaldson took over. Morris Heggie, former editor of The Dandy is the current writer.

Television
The Broons were portrayed in a sketch on the BBC Scotland comedy show Naked Video. Tony Roper was cast as Paw, Gregor Fisher played Maw, Elaine C. Smith portrayed the Bairn, Jonathan Watson appeared as Joe, and Louise Beattie appeared as Horace, with the other family members (and Oor Wullie) mentioned in passing. The sketch revolved around Paw's naivety in the modern world and his inability to move with the times, not even realising that his entire offspring are the product of an affair Maw was having with a farmer.

In December 2005, the BBC Scotland documentary Happy Birthday Broons celebrated the family's 70th anniversary with celebrity guests including Muriel Gray, Ford Kiernan, Sanjeev Kohli, Eddi Reader, Elaine C. Smith, Ricky Ross, Tony Roper, Tam Cowan, Grant Morrison, Frank Quitely and was narrated by Ewan McGregor. The programme was made by Angel Eye Media and was nominated for a Best Documentary BAFTA. It was followed by Happy Birthday Oor Wullie.

See also

 List of DC Thomson publications

References

External links
 The Official Broons and Oor Wullie website

1936 comics debuts
DC Thomson Comics strips
Scottish comic strips
Scottish comics characters
Comics about married people
1936 establishments in Scotland
Comics characters introduced in 1936
Fictional families
Fictional Scottish people
Humor comics
DC Thomson Comics characters
Comics set in Scotland